The PWBA Players Championship is one of the four major tournaments on the Professional Women's Bowling Association (PWBA) Tour. Unlike the U.S. Women’s Open and USBC Queens, which allow qualifying amateurs to participate, the PWBA Players Championship is open to PWBA members only.

Tournament history
The tournament began as the PWBA Championships in 1960 and ran every year through 1979, with the exception of the 1968, 1970 and 1977 seasons. Through the split and reformation of the organization, it also took the name WPBA Championship. After a long hiatus (1980 through 1994), it returned in 1995 as the Hammer Players Championship and ran every year through 2001. The PWBA ceased operations after the 2003 season. When the PWBA Tour was renewed in 2015, the tournament was not part of that year's schedule, but was brought back as the PWBA Players Championship for the 2016 through 2019 seasons.

The current tournament is contested over five rounds. All participants bowl two nine-game rounds of qualifying, with the field then cut to the top 18. These 18 players bowl two nine-game rounds of match play (17 round-robin head-to-head matches, followed by a position round match). Bowlers receive their scratch score for every game of match play, plus 30 bonus pins for winning a match. In the case of a tie, players receive 15 bonus pins each. The field is then cut to five players, who are seeded for the televised finals based on total score (including all bonus pins).

PWBA Players Championship winners

2019 Event
The 2019 PWBA Players Championship was held September 3–8 in Raleigh, North Carolina. The tournament had 50 total entries and an $89,800 prize fund, with a $20,000 top prize. A five-player stepladder format was used for the live televised finals on September 8. Singapore's Cherie Tan won from the #1 seed position to capture her second PWBA Tour title and first major.

Final Standings:
1. Cherie Tan (Singapore) – $20,000
2. Shannon O'Keefe (Shiloh, IL) – $10,000
3. Shannon Pluhowsky (Dayton, OH) – $6,000
4. Liz Johnson (Palatine, IL) – $5,000
5. Dasha Kovalova (Ukraine) – $4,000

Past Champions 
Listing of all champions dating back to the inaugural 1960 PWBA Championship.
2019: Cherie Tan
2018: Stefanie Johnson
2017: Liz Johnson
2016: Clara Guerrero

 Not held 2002–2015

2001: Liz Johnson
2000: Tennelle Grijalva
1999: Lisa Bishop
1998: Yvette Smith
1997: Marianne DiRupo
1996: Kim Adler
1995: Anne Marie Duggan

 Not held 1980–1994

1979: Cindy Coburn
1978: Toni Gillard
1977: Not held
1976: Patty Costello
1975: Pam Buckner
1974: Patty Costello
1973: Betty Morris
1972: Patty Costello
1971: Patty Costello
1970: Not held
1969: Dorothy Fothergill
1968: Not held
1967: Betty Mivalez
1966: Judy Lee
1965: Helen Duval
1964: Betty Kuczynski
1963: Janet Harman
1962: Stephanie Balogh
1961: Shirley Garms
1960: Marion Ladewig

References

Ten-pin bowling competitions in the United States